Huang Huidan is a Chinese artistic gymnast. She is the 2013 world uneven bars champion and 2014 world uneven bars silver medalist. She represents Zhejiang in domestic competitions.

Junior career 
Huang joined the Chinese national team in 2009. At the 2012 Chinese National Championships, she won a silver medal on the uneven bars behind then-reigning Olympic champion He Kexin. Later that year, she competed at the Asian Championships, where she won gold with the Chinese team and another silver on uneven bars.

2013 
At the 2013 National Games, Huang bested He on uneven bars, taking the gold medal. In October, she competed at the 2013 World Artistic Gymnastics Championships in Antwerp and won the bars title with a score of 15.400.

2014 
At the Asian Games in the fall of 2014, Huang earned a gold medal with the team and a silver on uneven bars. At the 2014 World Artistic Gymnastics Championships in Nanning, she helped the Chinese team to a silver medal and won another silver on uneven bars.

2015 
Huang competed at the 2015 Chinese National Championships, where she won a silver medal on bars behind teammate Fan Yilin. She did not compete at the 2015 World Championships in Glasgow because of a shoulder injury.

Competitive history

External links 
Huang Huidan at Fédération Internationale de Gymnastique

1996 births
Chinese female artistic gymnasts
Living people
World champion gymnasts
Asian Games medalists in gymnastics
Gymnasts at the 2014 Asian Games
Medalists at the World Artistic Gymnastics Championships
Asian Games gold medalists for China
Asian Games silver medalists for China
Medalists at the 2014 Asian Games
People from Liuzhou
Gymnasts from Guangxi
21st-century Chinese women